Paralia (Paralía, meaning "beach") is a town and a former municipality in Achaea, West Greece, Greece.

Since the 2011 local government reform it is part of the municipality Patras, of which it is a municipal unit. The municipal unit has an area of 11.978 km2. It is a suburb of Patras, about 6 km southwest of the city centre. The town population is about 6,500. It was a popular beach resort for residents of Patras till mid '80s. The new Greek National Road 9 (Patras - Pyrgos) runs south of the town.

The railway Patras - Pyrgos runs parallel to the coast, at about 200 m from the shore.

Population history

Subdivisions
The municipal unit Paralia is subdivided into the following communities:
Mintilogli
Paralia
Roitika

See also
List of settlements in Achaea

References

External links
GTP - Paralia
GTP - Municipality of Paralia

 
Populated places in Achaea